Carcharias is a genus of sand tiger sharks belonging to the family Odontaspididae. Once bearing many prehistoric species, all have gone extinct with the exception of the critically endangered sand tiger shark.

Description
Carcharias are 2.5 m long on average. The maximum weight of the shark is 158.8 kg.

Differentiating species of sharks is usually done by locating and measuring their fins. The second dorsal fin and the anal fin of Carcharias are very large.  In fact, they are about equal in size. The pectoral fins are triangular and only slightly larger than the dorsal fins. The teeth are very long and narrow with sharp points.  The teeth are smooth with no ridges. The tail is one third of the entire body size.

Diet
Carcharias species hunt bony fish, small sharks, rays, squids, crabs, and lobsters.

Habitat
Sand tiger sharks live in water depths ranging from 0 to 190 meters. They are found in the Pacific, Atlantic, and Indian oceans. They are commonly found in surf zones.

Species

With the Greek name 'Carcharias' literally translating to “shark”, many presently extant species have been placed into this genus before being moved to different genera and orders.

Extant species
 Carcharias taurus Rafinesque, 1810 (sand tiger shark)

Species previously described in this genus
 Carcharias acutidens  Rüppell, 1837 (accepted as Negaprion acutidens)
 Carcharias borneensis  Seale, 1910 (accepted as Carcharhinus sealei)
 Carcharias brachyrhynchos  Bleeker, 1859 (accepted as Carcharhinus amboinensis)
 Carcharias brevipinna  Müller & Henle, 1839 (accepted as Carcharhinus brevipinna)
 Carcharias falciformis  Müller & Henle, 1839 (accepted as Carcharhinus falciformis)
 Carcharias fronto  Jordan & Gilbert, 1882 (accepted as Negaprion brevirostris)
 Carcharias hemiodon  Müller & Henle, 1839 (accepted as Carcharhinus hemiodon)
 Carcharias sealei  Pietschmann, 1913 (accepted as Carcharhinus sealei)

Extinct species
Extinct species within this genus lived from the Cretaceous period to the Quaternary period (from 99.7 to 0.012 Ma). Fossils have been found all over the world, especially in the Miocene and Oligocene sediments of Europe, the United States and Australia, in the Eocene of Egypt, Europe and the United States, as well as in the Cretaceous of Australia, Canada, the United States, Europe and Africa.  Species from the fossil record include:

Cretaceous species
 Carcharias tenuiplicatus
 Carcharias holmdelensis Maastrichtian
 Carcharias samhammeri Late Cretaceous
 Carcharias heathi Late Cretaceous

Paleogene species
Carcharias acutissima (Agassiz, 1844) - Late Eocene
Carcharias atlasi
Carcharias hopei (Agassiz, 1843) - Late Palaeocene - Eocene
Carcharias koerti (Stromer, 1905)
Carcharias robusta? (Leriche, 1921) - Early Eocene
Carcharias teretidens - maybe placed into its own genus as Sylvestrilamia teretidens
Carcharias teretidens (White, 1931), - Late Palaeocene - Eocene
Carcharias tingitana (Arambourg, 1952)
Carcharias vincenti (Woodward, 1899)
Carcharias whitei (Arambourg, 1952) - Paleocene

Neogene
Carcharias acutissima (Agassiz, 1843), Oligocene - Pliocene
Carcharias reticulata (Probst, 1879), Oligocene - Miocene
Carcharias cuspidata (Agassiz, 1843), Oligocene - Miocene
Carcharias taurus Rafinesque, 1810, Pliocene - Present
Carcharias cuspidata (Agassiz, 1843), Pliocene - Miocene
Carcharias sp. - unidentified but maybe similar to the Carcharias contortidens as described by Agassiz in 1843, from the Miocene.
Carcharias reticulata (Kent 1994) maybe classified as Odontaspis acutissma (Agassiz 1843) from the Miocene.

References

External links

Odontaspididae
Extant Cretaceous first appearances
Shark genera
Taxa named by Constantine Samuel Rafinesque
Fish genera with one living species